Sodium perborate is chemical compound whose chemical formula may be written , , or, more properly, . Its name is sometimes abbreviated as PBS (not to be confused with phosphate-buffered saline).

The compound is commonly encountered in anhydrous form or as a hexahydrate (commonly called "monohydrate" or PBS-1 and "tetrahydrate" or PBS-4, after the early assumption that  would be the anhydrous form). They are both white, odorless, water-soluble solids.

This salt is widely used in laundry detergents, as one of the peroxide-based bleaches.

Structure
Unlike sodium percarbonate and sodium perphosphate, the compound is not simply an adduct with hydrogen peroxide – known only since 1961. Rather, it contains a perborate anion  consisting of a cyclic  core with two hydroxy groups attached to each boron atom. The ring adopts a chair conformation.

Hydrates

The anhydrous compound is commonly but incorrectly called a "monohydrate" after the historical formulation  instead of the correct . Both forms are white, odorless, water-soluble solids. The "monohydrate" and the "tetrahydrate" are the commercially important forms.

There does exist a true tetrahydrate , traditionally known as the "trihydrate", with no industrial significance. There is a CAS number for each of the three traditional "hydrates", the three "peroxyborate" versions of each (interpreted as a hydrogen peroxide adduct) and the poorly-defined "anhydrate" , totalling seven.

Chemistry
Sodium perborate undergoes hydrolysis in contact with water, producing hydrogen peroxide and borate.

More precisely, in solution the cyclic anion hydrolizes into two anions , which then enter in equilibrium with boric acid , hydrogen peroxide , the hydroperoxyl anion , and the tetrahydroxyborate anion :

As the concentration of the solution increases, other peroxoborate species become significant. At high borate concentrations, the sodium perborate with dimeric anion crystallizes out, due to its relatively low solubility.

The "monohydrate" form dissolves faster than the "tetrahydrate" and has higher heat stability; it is prepared by heating the "tetrahydrate". The commercial "anhydrate", or Oxoborate, is prepared by further heating of "monohydrate" and actually consists of sodium borate and boron–oxygen radical.

Preparation
Sodium perborate is manufactured by reaction of borax  and sodium hydroxide NaOH to give sodium metaborate , which is then reacted with hydrogen peroxide to give hydrated sodium perborate:

A surfactant may be added to control crystal size.

It may also be produced in the electrolysis of an aqueous solution of a solution containing borax, sodium carbonate and sodium bicarbonate (potassium dichromate is added to improve yield along with sodium silicate). A copper pipe is used as a cathode and platinum for the anode, the current being 6 amperes at 7 to 8 volts, and the temperature 10°C.

Uses
Sodium perborate serves as a stable source of active oxygen in many detergents, laundry detergents, cleaning products, and laundry bleaches. It is a less aggressive bleach than sodium hypochlorite and other chlorine-based bleaches, causing less degradation to dyes and textiles. Borates also have some non-oxidative bleaching properties. Sodium perborate releases oxygen rapidly at temperatures over 60 °C. To make it active at lower temperatures (40–60 °C), one must mix it with a suitable activator, typically tetraacetylethylenediamine (TAED).

Sodium perborate is also present in some tooth bleaching formulas for non vital root treated teeth. The compound is inserted in the root canal and left in place for an extended period of time to allow it to diffuse into the tooth and bleach stains from the inside out. However, this use has been banned in the European Union.

The compound has antiseptic properties and can act as a disinfectant. It is also used as a "disappearing" preservative in some brands of eye drops.

Sodium perborate is also used as an oxidizing reagent in organic synthesis. For example, it converts thioethers into sulfoxides and sulfones.

Safety
In the European Union, sodium perborate, like most borates, was classified as "carcinogenic, mutagenic, or toxic for reproduction" (CMR), category 1B of Regulation (EC) 790/2009, as a result of being included in Part 3 of Annex VI of the regulation 1272/2008 on Classification, Labelling and Packaging (CLP) of substances and mixtures. As a result, their use has been automatically banned in cosmetic products in the EU, in any concentration, starting 1 December 2010. That extends to the use of perborates for tooth whitening.

See also
 Amosan
 Sodium percarbonate
 Sodium perphosphate
 Persil

References

External links 
 Borax Detergent Book: Bleaching
 National Pollutant Inventory - Boron and compounds
 Sodium perborate history, image
 Sodium perborate in organic synthesis

Sodium compounds
Borates
Peroxides
Cleaning product components
Antiseptics
Bleaches
Oxidizing agents